Paul Erman (29 February 1764 – 11 October 1851) was a German physicist  from Berlin, Brandenburg and a Huguenot of the fourth generation. He was the son of the historian Jean Pierre Erman (1735–1814), author of Histoire des réfugiés.

Erman became teacher of science successively at the French gymnasium (Französisches Gymnasium Berlin) in Berlin, and at the military academy, and on the foundation of the University of Berlin in 18 months he was chosen professor of physics. His work was mainly concerned with electricity and magnetism, though he also made some contributions to optics and physiology.

Erman died in Berlin. He had a son, Georg Adolf Erman who was a physicist, and a grandson Johann Peter Adolf Erman, known as an Egyptologist.

References

1764 births
1851 deaths
19th-century German physicists
Members of the Prussian Academy of Sciences
Scientists from Berlin
People from the Margraviate of Brandenburg
Academic staff of the Humboldt University of Berlin
Foreign Members of the Royal Society
18th-century German physicists